Mount Zion Christian Academy (MZCA) is a private, college preparatory, non-denominational, co-educational Christian day school (grades K–12) and boarding school (grades 9–12) located in Durham, North Carolina.  The Academy is most noted for its successful prep basketball program.  The prep program has produced many college players, International players and NBA players.

Notable alumni

Basketball players
Marquis Daniels, NBA player
Cleanthony Early, professional basketball player
Cory Hightower, NBA player
Steven Hunter, NBA player
Jarrett Jack, NBA player
Tracy McGrady, seven-time NBA All-Star
Brandon Rush, NBA player, 2015 NBA champion with Golden State Warriors
Amar'e Stoudemire, six-time NBA All-Star, now serves as player development assistant for the Brooklyn Nets
Rodney White, professional basketball player
Elijah Wilson, professional basketball player

References

External links
Mount Zion Christian Academy: school's web site

Christian schools in North Carolina
Private high schools in North Carolina
Schools in Durham County, North Carolina
Education in Durham, North Carolina
Private middle schools in North Carolina
Private elementary schools in North Carolina